Abraham Greenberg (August 22, 1881, in New York City – May 10, 1941, in Manhattan, New York City) was an American lawyer and politician from New York.

Life
He attended the public schools. In 1903, he began to practice law in New York City.

Greenberg was a member of the New York State Assembly (New York Co., 31st D.) in 1908.

He was again a member of the State Assembly (New York Co., 26th D.) in 1913, and was one of the Managers (i.e. assemblymen who acted as prosecutors) at the impeachment trial of Governor William Sulzer.

Greenberg was declared elected to the 137th New York State Legislature, and sat through the whole regular session while his election was contested by Progressive Joseph Steinberg. On March 27, 1914, the day before the annual adjournment sine die, Steinberg was seated in place of Greenberg.

Greenberg was a member of the New York State Senate (17th D.) in 1927 and 1928. His election was unsuccessfully contested by Republican Courtlandt Nicoll.

He died on May 10, 1941, in the Rockefeller Institute in Manhattan.

References

1881 births
1941 deaths
Democratic Party New York (state) state senators
Politicians from Manhattan
Democratic Party members of the New York State Assembly
Jewish American state legislators in New York (state)
20th-century American politicians